Where Have All the Soldiers Gone?: The Transformation of Modern Europe, is a 2008 non-fiction book about the rise of national pacifism in post-World War II Europe by James J. Sheehan.

References

Books about international relations
English-language books
History books about World War II
Non-fiction books about diplomacy
Non-fiction books about war
2008 non-fiction books